Slut is a German indie rock band from Ingolstadt, Bavaria. The band's lyrics are primarily written and sung in English.

History
The band was founded in 1994 by Christian Neuburger (vocals, guitar), Matthias Neuburger (drums), Rainer Schaller (guitar), Gerd Rosenacker (bass guitar) and Phillip Zhang the accompanying keyboard artist. After they recorded their first album, Rene Arbeithuber (keyboard, vocals, guitar) also joined.
From 1997 to 1998, along with Rene and Rainer's band, 'Pelzig', they lived and recorded in a castle near Ingolstadt.
In 2002, two of their singles charted on the DAC: Easy to Love got to No. 8, and Time Is Not A Remedy hit No. 18. 
In 2005, Slut represented Bavaria in the Bundesvision Song Contest 2005, with the song "Why Pourquoi (I Think I Like You)", placing 12th with 17 points.

So far they have not appeared live in Britain or the USA, despite several extensive European tours to Romania, The Czech Republic, Italy and France.

Discography

Albums
 For Exercise And Amusement, 1996
 Sensation (EP), 1997
 Interference, 1998
 Lookbook, 2000
 Teardrops (EP), 2001
 Nothing Will Go Wrong, 2002
 ready, slut, go! (EP / Split with Readymade), 2003
 All We Need Is Silence, 2004
 Songs aus Die Dreigroschenoper (Songs from The Threepenny Opera), July 14, 2006
 StillNo1, 2008
 Corpus Delicti (collaboration with Juli Zeh), 2009
 Alienation, 2013
 Talks Of Paradise, 2021

Singles
 Welcome 2 (taken from Lookbook), 2000
 It Was Easier (taken from Lookbook), 2000
 Andy (taken from Lookbook), 2000
 Easy To Love (taken from Nothing Will Go Wrong), 2002
 Time Is Not A Remedy (taken from Nothing Will Go Wrong), 2002
 Lost Emotion (taken from All We Need Is Silence), 2004
 Why Pourquoi (taken from All We Need Is Silence), 2005
 Next Big Thing (taken from Alienation), 2013
 For the Soul There Is No Hospital, 2020

References

External links
 Official website (German/English/French)

1994 establishments in Germany
German indie rock groups
Participants in the Bundesvision Song Contest